"Aawaz – speak up against sexual violence" is a song written by Jim Ankan Deka, an Indian musician and documentary film maker. The lyrics are penned together by Jim and singer Ritwika Bhattacharya. Sa Re Ga Ma Pa L'il Champs (2009) finalist Antara Nandy has rendered her vocals along with Ritwika and Queen Hazarika.

Background and writing
Jim and Ritwika had originally composed the song for a rally in Bangalore in 2012 following the death of the Delhi gang rape victim. The song is all about asking people to speak up against sexual violence.

Video
The video of the song is directed by Parmita Borah. The video includes three short stories dealing with violence against single as well as married women and child abuse.

Accolades

References

External links
 
 Aawaz at iTunes
 Aawaz at Amazon.com
 Aawaz at Google Play
 Aawaz at MTV

2013 songs
2013 singles
Indian songs
Hindi-language songs